is a Japanese aristocratic kin group. The Nijō was a branch of the Fujiwara clan, founded by Kujō Michiie's son Nijō Yoshizane. The Nijō was one of the Five regent houses; from which, the Sesshō and Kampaku were chosen.

History
The family name Nijō derived from Yoshizane's residence in Kyoto, where is believed to locate between two roads, the south of "Nijō-Ōji" (二条大路) and the east of "Higashi no Tōin-Ōji" (東洞院大路). As of the Muromachi and Edo period, Nijō family had a relative close relationship comparing with other four regent houses, and the leaders of the Nijō were given names (henki, 偏諱) from that of incumbent shōguns'. Nijō Nariyuki, the last Sesshō and Kampaku, regent from the Fujiwara clan, also came from this family.

In 1526, Tominokōji Sukenao (富小路資直, d. 1535) was promoted to the rank dōjō (堂上) of Kuge, and the ancestor of the Tominokōji family, Tominokōji Michinao (富小路道直), was claimed to be a son of Nijō Michihira.

Family Tree

Matsuzono family

See also
 Japanese clans
 List of Kuge families
 Five Regent Houses

References 

 
Japanese clans
Fujiwara clan